The Tata EVision is a concept EV(Electric Vehicle) compact sedan by the Indian automobile manufacturer Tata Motors.

The EVision was unveiled at the 88th Geneva Motor Show in 2018.

References

External links

Front-wheel-drive vehicles
Sedans
Compact cars
Evision
Cars introduced in 2018